Leptothrips is a genus of thrips in the family Phlaeothripidae.

Species
 Leptothrips astutus
 Leptothrips cassiae
 Leptothrips cognatopini
 Leptothrips columbianus
 Leptothrips costalimai
 Leptothrips distalis
 Leptothrips fasciculatus
 Leptothrips garciaaldreti
 Leptothrips gracilis
 Leptothrips heliomanes
 Leptothrips jamaicaensis
 Leptothrips larreae
 Leptothrips longicapitis
 Leptothrips macroocellatus
 Leptothrips mali
 Leptothrips mcconelli
 Leptothrips minusculus
 Leptothrips obesus
 Leptothrips occidentalis
 Leptothrips opimus
 Leptothrips oribates
 Leptothrips papago
 Leptothrips pini
 Leptothrips purpuratus
 Leptothrips singularis
 Leptothrips tenuiceps
 Leptothrips trinitatensis
 Leptothrips vittipennis
 Leptothrips yaqui
 Leptothrips zongolicaensis

References

Phlaeothripidae
Thrips
Thrips genera